Anne Marshall (born 1941) is a female former swimmer who competed for England.

Swimming career
She represented England and won a gold medal in the 440 yards medley relay and silver medal in the 440 yards freestyle relay at the 1958 British Empire and Commonwealth Games in Cardiff, Wales.

She swam for the Kingston Ladies and Hampstead Swimming Clubs.

References

1941 births
Living people
English female swimmers
Swimmers at the 1958 British Empire and Commonwealth Games
Commonwealth Games medallists in swimming
Commonwealth Games gold medallists for England
Commonwealth Games silver medallists for England
20th-century English women
21st-century English women
Medallists at the 1958 British Empire and Commonwealth Games